Thong yip, also known as "pinched gold egg yolks" in English, is one of the nine auspicious traditional Thai desserts. It is usually made for important occasions and ceremonies such as weddings, ordinations, and housewarmings. Thong yip, like many other egg-based sweets, was introduced by Japanese-Portuguese Maria Guyomar de Pinha in the reign of Somdet Phra Narai Maharat during the Ayutthaya Kingdom. Its origin is the Portuguese sweet called trouxas das caldas.

Etymology
In Thai, the word thong means "gold" and yip means "to pick". It is believed that when thong yip is used in blessing ceremonies or as a gift to anyone, it will bring wealth and success in work; a person can turn something ordinary into gold once picked up. Thong yip’s shape resembles that of a flower. The number of folds used for thong yip can be 3, 5, or 8, depending on one's preference.

See also
 List of Thai desserts

References 

Thai desserts and snacks
Egg dishes
Portuguese fusion cuisine